Lientur Channel is a channel between Lemaire Island and Bryde Island connecting Paradise Harbor with Gerlache Strait, off the west coast of Graham Land, Antarctica. It was first roughly charted by the Belgian Antarctic Expedition, 1897–99. The channel was named by the fourth Chilean Antarctic Expedition (1949–50) after the Lientur, one of the ships used during this expedition.

References

Channels of the Southern Ocean
Straits of Graham Land
Danco Coast